Abdul Rahman bin Sulaiman (26 May 1946 – 30 January 2022) was a Malaysian politician and journalist. He died in Kuala Lumpur on 30 January 2022, at the age of 75.

Election results

Honours
  :
  Commander of the Order of Meritorious Service (PJN) – Datuk (2007)
  Commander of the Order of Loyalty to the Crown of Malaysia (PSM) – Tan Sri (2016)

References 

1946 births
2022 deaths
People from Perak
Malaysian people of Malay descent
Malaysian Muslims
United Malays National Organisation politicians
Commanders of the Order of Meritorious Service
Commanders of the Order of Loyalty to the Crown of Malaysia
Members of the Dewan Rakyat
Malaysian journalists